Clyde & Co is a global law firm headquartered in London, United Kingdom. The firm is one of the top 10 largest law firms in the City of London and has the largest dispute resolution practice of any UK law firm. It employs 2,600 legal professionals and 5,000 total staff. In 2021–22, Clyde & Co's revenue was £650 million.

History 
Clyde & Co was founded by Scottish lawyer Richard Arthur Clyde. He came from a distinguished legal family, which in the last century has produced two Lords of the Court of Session in Scotland. Richard Clyde's nephew, the late Lord Clyde, was a Lord of Appeal in Ordinary from 1996 to 2001.

The earliest record of Dick Clyde as a solicitor in independent practice dates to 1928. In 1933, he left his position as an assistant solicitor with a local firm and set up his own office in Lime Street in the heart of London's insurance district. He managed to attract instructions from Lloyd's underwriters and insurance companies, and within a short time went into partnership with Maurice Hill, a member of the founding family of the Liverpool solicitors, Hill Dickinson and a descendant of Sir Rowland Hill, who had established the penny post.

Michael Payton, who joined the firm in 1966, assumed the post of Senior Partner in 1984, and was named chairman in 2013, with James Burns elected to take his place as Senior Partner. In the next three years, more than fifteen new offices were added on five continents including: Düsseldorf, Miami, Cape Town, Johannesburg, Melbourne, and Edinburgh. James Burns was named Management Partner of the Year by Legal Business in April 2016.

In October 2016, Simon Konsta was elected Senior Partner, having previously been the firm's Head of Insurance since 2013 and a member of its Global Management Board since 2011. In July 2021, Carolena Gordon assumed the title of Senior Partner.

Expansion 
Reflecting the firm's growing international outlook, in 1981 Clyde & Co opened its first overseas office in Hong Kong. Many others followed in the Middle East, Asia, Europe, and America.

In 2011, the firm announced mergers with Canadian firm Nicholl Paskell-Mede and UK firm Barlow Lyde & Gilbert (BLG), not to be confused with Canadian law firm Borden Ladner Gervais . The merger with Barlow Lyde & Gilbert was reported as the largest merger between two UK law firms with an expected turnover of over £300 million.

The firm became the first international law office to open in Libya after the overthrow of the Gaddafi regime, with the opening of an office in Tripoli in August 2012.

In September 2015, the firm merged with leading Scottish firm Simpson & Marwick.

In recent years, the firm has opened new offices in Sydney, Perth, Melbourne, Beijing, Madrid, Atlanta,Johannesburg, Brisbane, Miami, Düsseldorf, Chicago, Washington, D.C., Mexico City, Los Angeles, Orange County, Hamburg, Munich, Denver, Las Vegas, and Phoenix, among others.

In 2022, the firm announced that it would merge with BLM (law firm). The combined firm now goes by the Clyde & Co name, has 2,600 lawyers in 60 offices, and has an annual revenue of more than £700 million. 

In 2023, the firm will be opening new offices in Milan and Boston.

Controversy 
In 2010, while working in Tanzania, former partner Krista Bates blew the whistle on an African lawyer working in association with Clyde & Co. who was involved in bribery and money laundering. After being suspended and expelled from the partnership in 2011, she sued, claiming whistle-blower status. Clyde & Co. argued that Bates couldn’t claim whistle-blower status because she was a partner in the business, not an employed worker. In May 2014, the Supreme Court of the United Kingdom ruled in favor of Bates, stating that LLP members are “workers” for the purpose of whistleblowing protection, granting them the same benefits as workers. After the ruling, in June 2014, Bates joined the African airline Fastjet as its general counsel.

In September 2020, in connection with the investigations into $4.5 billion missing from 1MDB, a $330 million account held by Clyde & Co was named in a civil forfeiture case filed by US Department of Justice prosecutors, who alleged the account was connected to a failed joint project with Venezuela's PDVSA which was established by 1MDB and a company established by Tarek Obaid, PetroSaudi.

Clyde & Co provided legal representation to an offshore company set up by Gennady Timchenko, a Russian oligarch and close Vladimir Putin confidante.

See also 
 List of 100 largest UK law firms
 List of 100 largest European law firms

References

External links 
 Clyde & Co official site - Clyde & Co

Law firms based in London
Law firms of Singapore
Foreign law firms with offices in the United States
Law firms established in 1933
Foreign law firms with offices in Hong Kong
1933 establishments in England